Lake San Marcos is a census-designated place (CDP) in the North County region of the San Diego metropolitan area. It is nominally independent of San Marcos proper, but functionally subservient to the city.

History 
There is considerable evidence of human inhabitation of the area currently known as Lake San Marcos long before the Spanish establishment of the Mission San Diego de Alcala in A.D. 1769. Native American tribes lived and flourished near the San Luis Rey River in the Late Prehistoric period. Much of this area was originally part of Rancho Los Vallecito de San Marcos. On April 22, 1840, Governor Juan Bautista Alvarado granted the 8,877-acre Rancho Los Vallecitos de San Marcos to Don Jose Maria Alvarado who married Lugarda Osuna, daughter of the owner of San Dieguito Rancho, Don Juan Maria Osuna.

Geography
Lake San Marcos is an unincorporated area of San Diego County, surrounded by the City of San Marcos. It is a resort-based community surrounding the Lake San Marcos reservoir. It is located at  (33.122562, -117.209411).

The lake after which the area is named is a large artificial body of water originally created for purposes of irrigation and watering cattle; today, however, it is used primarily for recreational and commercial purposes. The lake was created by a concrete dam built between 1946 and 1951.

Demographics

The population was 4,437 at the 2010 census, up from 4,138 at the 2000 census. The community attracts a large number of retired and elderly residents though over time younger families with children are moving in.

2010
At the 2010 census Lake San Marcos had a population of 4,437. The racial makeup of Lake San Marcos was 3,978 (89.7%) White, 37 (0.8%) African American, 20 (0.5%) Native American, 133 (3.0%) Asian, 3 (0.1%) Pacific Islander, 186 (4.2%) from other races, and 80 (1.8%) from two or more races. Hispanic or Latino of any race were 464 people (10.5%).

The census reported that 4,435 people (100% of the population) lived in households, no one lived in non-institutionalized group quarters and 2 (0%) were institutionalized.

There were 2,328 households, 221 (9.5%) had children under the age of 18 living in them, 1,112 (47.8%) were opposite-sex married couples living together, 131 (5.6%) had a female householder with no husband present, 56 (2.4%) had a male householder with no wife present.  There were 81 (3.5%) unmarried opposite-sex partnerships, and 16 (0.7%) same-sex married couples or partnerships. 877 households (37.7%) were one person and 659 (28.3%) had someone living alone who was 65 or older. The average household size was 1.91.  There were 1,299 families (55.8% of households); the average family size was 2.45.

The age distribution was 366 people (8.2%) under the age of 18, 184 people (4.1%) aged 18 to 24, 597 people (13.5%) aged 25 to 44, 1,212 people (27.3%) aged 45 to 64, and 2,078 people (46.8%) who were 65 or older.  The median age was 63.3 years. For every 100 females, there were 79.3 males.  For every 100 females age 18 and over, there were 76.7 males.

There were 2,533 housing units at an average density of 1,402.0 per square mile, of the occupied units 1,835 (78.8%) were owner-occupied and 493 (21.2%) were rented. The homeowner vacancy rate was 2.3%; the rental vacancy rate was 5.3%.  3,417 people (77.0% of the population) lived in owner-occupied housing units and 1,018 people (22.9%) lived in rental housing units.

2000
At the 2000 census there were 4,138 people, 2,269 households, and 1,300 families in the CDP. The population density was 2,283.4 inhabitants per square mile (882.7/km). The racial makeup of the CDP was 93.86% White, 0.27% African American, 0.14% Native American, 1.74% Asian, 0.12% Pacific Islander, 2.46% from other races, and 1.40% from two or more races. Hispanic or Latino of any race were 5.73%.

Of the 2,269 households 5.4% had children under the age of 18 living with them, 52.2% were married couples living together, 3.9% had a female householder with no husband present, and 42.7% were non-families. 38.1% of households were one person and 29.4% were one person aged 65 or older.  The average household size was 1.81 and the average family size was 2.29.

The age distribution was 5.9% under the age of 18, 2.3% from 18 to 24, 10.4% from 25 to 44, 21.0% from 45 to 64, and 60.4% 65 or older.  The median age was 71 years. For every 100 females, there were 77.1 males.  For every 100 females age 18 and over, there were 74.9 males.

The median household income was $50,857 and the median family income  was $59,496. Males had a median income of $42,250 versus $30,993 for females. The per capita income for the CDP was $35,768.  About 2.1% of families and 3.2% of the population were below the poverty line, including none of those under age 18 and 3.3% of those age 65 or over.

Government
While Lake San Marcos is an independent and unincorporated community, it is also greatly dependent upon the city of San Marcos for many public services, including public schools, the fire department, the Vallecitos Water District, and the San Marcos sheriff station. Lake San Marcos is governed by the Lake San Marcos Community Association, a nonprofit organization.

References 

Census-designated places in San Diego County, California
North County (San Diego County)
Census-designated places in California